Henrik Strube  (born February 21, 1949) is a Danish guitarist and musician.

Discography

 Fødelandssange (1972)
 Ven og Fjende (1976)
 Jackpot (1977)
 Hunden er løs (1979)
 Den Flyvende Duo (1981)
 Unruhrig (1983)
 8338 (1983)
 Som sol og måne (1985)
 Hjertets vagabonder (1986)
 Nyt land (1988)
 Bellevue (1990)
 Blå Himmel over byen (1997)
 Mærk'ligt (2002)
 STORYBEAT (2008)

See also
List of Danish composers

References
Official website 
History article at Røde Mor
Story-Entertainers

Danish rock guitarists
1949 births
Living people